Pappu Singh (born 27 September 1993) is an Indian first-class cricketer who plays for Jharkhand. He made his Twenty20 debut for Railways in the 2016–17 Inter State Twenty-20 Tournament on 5 February 2017.

References

External links
 

1993 births
Living people
Indian cricketers
Jharkhand cricketers
Railways cricketers
People from Ranchi
Cricketers from Jharkhand
Wicket-keepers